Carbonic anhydrase-related protein 10 is an enzyme that in humans is encoded by the CA10 gene.

This gene encodes a protein that belongs to the carbonic anhydrase family of zinc metalloenzymes, which catalyze the reversible hydration of carbon dioxide in various biological processes. The protein encoded by this gene is an acatalytic member of the alpha-carbonic anhydrase subgroup, and it is thought to play a role in the central nervous system, especially in brain development. Multiple transcript variants encoding the same protein have been found for this gene.

References

External links

Further reading